St Jerome Penitent and Abraham Served by the Angels are two paintings by the Italian Renaissance master Antonello da Messina. They are housed in the Pinacoteca Civica, Reggio Calabria.

These two  panels are considered amongst the first works by Antonello da Messina. They were both intended for devotion of private owners.

St. Jerome

The painting shows elements inspired both the Flemish and Italian painting schools. The former belongs the rugged landscape, while typically Italian is the kneeling posture of St. Jerome.

Abraham Served by the Angels
Due to its poor conditions, for a long time this work was considered a part of a larger Nativity. The identification of theme was possible after the finding of a small panel by a 15th-century French master (now at Denver) in which the scene is reproduced in its entirety, and which was surely known by the Italian master: the part missing in Antonello's work would show Sarah spying Abraham from the hut's door.

See also
Italian Renaissance painting, development of themes

Notes

Sources

External links
Description (St. Jerome) 
Description (Abraham) 

1450s paintings
Paintings by Antonello da Messina
Paintings of crucifixes
da Messina
Lions in art
Paintings depicting Abraham
Angels in art